Sunrise on the Sufferbus is the second studio album by American rock band Masters of Reality, released in 1992.

On the album, the band was joined by British drummer Ginger Baker.

Track listing 
All songs by Chris Goss, except where noted.
"She Got Me (When She Got Her Dress On)" - 2:47
"J.B. Witchdance" (Baker, Goss) - 3:37
"Jody Sings" - 3:03
"Rolling Green" - 3:41
"Ants in the Kitchen" (Baker, Goss) - 3:22
"V.H.V" (Googe, Goss) - 4:21
"Bicycle" - 0:47
"100 Years (Of Tears on the Wind)" - 4:06
"T.U.S.A" (Baker, Googe, Goss, Rey) - 2:59
"Tilt-A-Whirl" - 3:42
"Rabbit One" - 3:33
"Madonna" - 0:38
"Gimme Water" (Baker, Goss) - 2:23
"Moon in Your Pocket" - 3:31

Personnel 
Chris Goss - vocals, guitars, keyboards
Googe - bass, backing vocals
Ginger Baker - drums, backing vocals and lead vocals on the track "T.U.S.A."
Additional co-production by Daniel Rey and Jason Corsaro

References

Masters of Reality albums
1993 albums
Albums produced by Chris Goss
Chrysalis Records albums